The 2016 America East men's basketball tournament took place on March 2, 7, and 12, 2016. The entire tournament took place on campus sites with the higher-seeded school hosting each game throughout the championship. The winner of the championship game earned an automatic bid to the 2016 NCAA tournament.

Seeds
Teams were seeded by conference record, with ties broken by record between the tied teams followed by record against the regular-season champion, if necessary.

Schedule

Bracket and results
Teams will reseed after each round with highest remaining seeds receiving home court advantage.

See also
America East Conference
2016 America East women's basketball tournament

References

External links
 2016 America East Men's Basketball Tournament

America East Conference men's basketball tournament
2015–16 America East Conference men's basketball season